The 1925 Loyola Wolf Pack football team was an American football team that represented Loyola College of New Orleans (now known as Loyola University New Orleans) as a member of the Southern Intercollegiate Athletic Association (SIAA) during the 1925 college football season. In its second season under head coach Moon Ducote, the team compiled a 2–7 record (1–3 against SIAA opponents). 

Quarterback J. R. "Deuce" Domengeaux was the star of the team on offense. Gene Wallet was the team captain.

Schedule

References

Loyola
Loyola Wolf Pack football seasons
Loyola Wolf Pack football